Etam may refer to:

Etam (biblical figure), several people and places in the Bible
Etam (biblical town), between Bethlehem and Tekoa
Etam UK, former British women's clothing retailer
Etam, West Virginia, an unincorporated community in Preston County, West Virginia
Rock of Etam, hiding place of Samson

See also
 Etam plc v Rowan, a 1989 UK labour law case
 ETA (m), an armed Basque separatist group